Muhhin or Muhhina is a surname. Notable people with the surname include: 

Jelena Muhhina (born 1988), Estonian figure skater
Sergei Muhhin (born 1990), Estonian  figure skater, brother of Jelena

See also
Mukhin